Told You So may refer to:

Told You So (Sparkle album), 2000 album by singer Sparkle
Told You So (Christopher album), 2014 album by Danish singer Christopher
"Told You So" (Christopher song), title track from album above by Danish singer Christopher
"Told You So" (Miguel song), from his 2017 album War & Leisure
"Told You So" (Paramore song), from their 2017 album After Laughter
"Told You So" (Nathan Evans song), 2021 song by Scottish singer Nathan Evans
"Told You So", Joe Walsh song featuring Don Felder, from his 1983 album You Bought It – You Name It
"Told You So", Colette Carr song featuring Porcelain Black from Colette Carr 2013 album Skitszo
"Told You So", Depeche Mode song, from their 1983 album Construction Time Again
"Told You So", Drowning Pool song from their 2001 album Sinner